John James Davis (March 12, 1932 – January 1, 2013) was an American football guard who played for the Boston Patriots of the American Football League. He played college football at the University of Maryland. He also had played in the Canadian Football League for the Hamilton Tiger-Cats.

Davis died January 1, 2013.

References

External links
NFL.com player page
Just Sports Stats

1932 births
2013 deaths
American football guards
Canadian football guards
American players of Canadian football
American male professional wrestlers
Hamilton Tiger-Cats players
Boston Patriots players
Maryland Terrapins football players
People from Braddock, Pennsylvania
People from Palm Harbor, Florida
Players of American football from Pennsylvania
Sportspeople from the Tampa Bay area
American Football League players